The 2007 Cincinnati Bearcats football team represented the University of Cincinnati in the 2007 NCAA Division I FBS football season. The team, coached by Brian Kelly, played its home games in Nippert Stadium, as it has since 1923. This was Kelly's first complete season with the Bearcats, having coached them to a 27–24 win against Western Michigan in the 2007 International Bowl.

The 2007 season was a breakthrough for Cincinnati football, as it saw the Bearcats break into the national rankings for the first time since 1976. The Bearcats' highest rank of their 2007 campaign was 15th in the AP Poll.

Schedule

Rankings

Roster

Coaching staff

Brian Kelly – head coach

Keith Gilmore – Assistant Head Coach/Defensive Line

Jeff Quinn – Offensive Coordinator/Offensive Line

Joe Tresey – Defensive Coordinator

Kerry Coombs – Defensive Backs Coach

Mike Elston – Recruiting/Special Teams/Tight Ends

Greg Forest – Quarterbacks Coach

Tim Hinton – Linebackers Coach

Ernest Jones – Running Backs Coach

Charley Molnar – Wide Receivers Coach

John Widecan – Assistant AD/Football Operations

Brad Bury – Student Assistant

Paul Longo – Strength and Conditioning

Jesse Minter – Defensive Graduate Assistant

Michael Painter – Offensive Staff Intern

Adam Shorter – Offensive Graduate Assistant

Marty Spieler – Defensive Staff Intern

Erin Clayton – Administrative Assistant

Jacob Flint – Assistant Strength Coach

Maria Gruber – Administrative Coordinator

Matt Louis – Administrative Coordinator

John Sells – Video Coordinator

Game summaries

Southeast Missouri State
The games was the first regular season game for new coach, Brian Kelly.  The Bearcats' 59-3 victory was the most lopsided in school history since beating Louisiana-Monroe, then known as Northeast Louisiana, 63-0 in 1977.  The Bearcats' 615 yards was the third most in school history.

Oregon State

Miami University

Dustin Grutza, who started in place of the injured UC quarterback Ben Mauk threw for two scores to lead the Bearcats to a 47-10 win over the Miami RedHawks.  UC defense dominated the game with a fumble recovery, three interceptions, a blocked punt, and five sacks.

Marshall

San Diego State

Rutgers

Louisville

Pittsburgh

South Florida

The 31 points scored in the first quarter is a Cincinnati record for most points scored in a single quarter.

Connecticut

West Virginia

Cincinnati came into the game predicted by some to upset the mountaineers. However, for the majority of the game West Virginia used their punishing ground attack to build a 21-7 lead heading into the fourth quarter. However, after a costly fumble leading to another West Virginia touchdown, the Bearcats rallied. Their defense force two fumbles and a punt by the Mountaineers, and the offense cashed in with two touchdowns. After UC's second touchdown and a failed two-point conversion, West Virginia recovered an onside kick attempt and managed to run out the clock, handing the Bearcats their third loss.

Syracuse

PapaJohns.com Bowl

.
The Cincinnati Bearcats led by Quarterback Ben Mauk ended Southern Mississippi coach Jeff Bower's 17-year tenure as head coach at Southern Miss in losing fashion, 31-21. Mauk went 30-52 for 334 yards, 4 touchdowns and 3 interceptions. Mauk became the 3rd player in Cincinnati history to throw for 3,000 yards in a season. His favorite target was Dominick Goodman who caught 7 passes for 95 yards and 2 touchdowns. The defense was led by DeAngelo Smith who had a whopping 3 interceptions. For Southern Miss, Jeremy Young went 18-32 for 122 yards and 2 touchdowns, but 3 interceptions. Damion Fletcher led the team in rushing and receiving, with 155 yards on 29 carries on the ground and 7 catches for 50 yards through the air. Southern Miss jumped to an early 7-0 lead on a 10-yard pass from Young to Shawn Nelson in the 1st quarter. In the 2nd quarter, Cincinnati struck back when Mauk threw both touchdown passes to Goodman to end the half. In the 3rd quarter Mauk hooked up with Ernest Jackson for 29 yards and a touchdown to make it 21-7 in favor of the Bearcats. Young then had a 1-yard run with 6:48 to play in the 3rd to make it 21-14. Cincinnati then pulled away when Mauk hit Antwuan Giddens for his last touchdown. A field goal by Jake Rogers made it 31-14 Bearcats, and they never looked back.

Awards and milestones

All-Americans
Mike Mickens, CB
Kevin Huber, P

Big East Conference honors
Special Teams Player of the Year: Kevin Huber
Coach of the Year: Brian Kelly

Offensive player of the week
Week 3: Dustin Grutza
Week 5: Ben Mauk
Week 13: Ben Mauk

Defensive player of the week
Week 1: Mike Mickens
Week 6: Ryan Manalac
Week 10: Haruki Nakamura

Special teams player of the week
Week 2: Jacob Rogers
Week 6: Kevin Huber

Big East Conference All-Conference First Team
Terrill Byrd, DL
Mike Mickens, DB
Haruki Nakamura, DB
Kevin Huber, P

Big East Conference All-Conference Second Team
Marcus Barnett, WR
Trevor Canfield, OL
Anthony Hoke, DL
DeAngelo Smith, DB

Players in the 2008 NFL draft

References

Cincinnati
Cincinnati Bearcats football seasons
Birmingham Bowl champion seasons
Cincinnati Bearcats football